Nanping is a town of Lintao County, Dingxi City, Gansu, China.

Nanping is noted for its Nuo opera, which has been recognized as intangible cultural heritage of Gansu province.

References 

Township-level divisions of Gansu
Lintao County